Philip Wells Woods (November 2, 1931 – September 29, 2015) was an American jazz alto saxophonist, clarinetist, bandleader, and composer.

Biography
Woods was born in Springfield, Massachusetts. After inheriting a saxophone at age 12, he began taking lessons at a local music shop. His heroes on the alto saxophone included Benny Carter and Johnny Hodges. He studied music with Lennie Tristano at the Manhattan School of Music and at the Juilliard School. His friend, Joe Lopes, coached him on clarinet as there was no saxophone major at Juilliard at the time and received a bachelor’s degree in 1952. Although he did not copy Charlie Parker, Woods was known as the New Bird, a nickname also given to other alto saxophone players such as Sonny Stitt and Cannonball Adderley.

In the 1950s, Woods began to lead his own bands. Quincy Jones invited him to accompany Dizzy Gillespie on a world tour sponsored by the U.S. State Department. A few years later he toured Europe with Jones, and in 1962 he toured Russia with Benny Goodman.

After moving to France in 1968, Woods led the European Rhythm Machine, a group which tended toward avant-garde jazz. He returned to the United States in 1972 and, after an unsuccessful attempt to establish an electronic group, he formed a quintet which was still performing, with some changes of personnel, in 2004. As his theme, Woods used a piece titled "How's Your Mama?"

Woods earned the top alto sax player award almost 30 times in DownBeat magazine's annual readers' poll. His quintet was awarded the top small combo title several times.

In 1979, Woods recorded the album More Live at Armadillo World Headquarters in Austin, Texas. Perhaps his best known recorded work as a sideman is a pop piece, his alto sax solo on Billy Joel's 1977 "Just the Way You Are". He also played the alto sax solo on Steely Dan's "Doctor Wu" from their 1975 album Katy Lied, as well as Paul Simon's "Have a Good Time" from the 1975 album Still Crazy After All These Years.

Although Woods was primarily a saxophonist, he was also a clarinet player and solos can be found scattered through his recordings. One particular example is his clarinet solo on "Misirlou" on the compilation album, Into the Woods.

Woods, along with Rick Chamberlain and Ed Joubert, founded the organization Celebration of the Arts (COTA) in 1978 late one night in the bar at the Deer Head Inn in Delaware Water Gap. The organization would eventually become the Delaware Water Gap Celebration of the Arts. Their initial goal was to help foster an appreciation of jazz and its relationship to other artistic disciplines. Each year, the organization hosts the Celebration of the Arts Festival in the town of Delaware Water Gap in September.

In 2005, Jazzed Media released the documentary Phil Woods: A Life in E Flat – Portrait of a Jazz Legend, directed by Rich Lerner and produced by Graham Carter.

Woods was married to Chan Parker, the common-law wife of Charlie Parker, for seventeen years and was the stepfather to Chan's daughter, Kim. On September 4, 2015, he performed a tribute to Charlie Parker with Strings at the Manchester Craftsmen's Guild and announced at the end of the show that he would be retiring. He died of emphysema on September 29, 2015, at the age of 83.

Awards
 Grammy Award, Best Large Jazz Ensemble Performance: Images, 1975
 Grammy Award, Best Instrumental Jazz Performance, Individual or Group: Live from the Show Boat (1977), More Live (1982), At the Vanguard (1983)
 NEA Jazz Masters, 2007

Discography

As leader/co-leader 
 1954– 55: Pot Pie (New Jazz, 1963) with Jon Eardley
 1955: Woodlore (Prestige, 1956)
 1956: Pairing Off (Prestige, 1956)
 1956: The Young Bloods (Prestige, 1957) with Donald Byrd

 1957: Four Altos (Prestige) with Gene Quill, Hal Stein, Sahib Shihab
 1957: Phil and Quill with Prestige with Gene Quill
 1957: Sugan (Status)
 1957: Warm Woods (Epic)
 1961: Rights of Swing (Candid)
 1967: Greek Cooking (Impulse!)
 1968: Alto Summit (MPS) with Lee Konitz, Pony Poindexter and Leo Wright
 1968: Alive And Well In Paris (Pathé) 
 1969: Round Trip (Verve)
 1970: Phil Woods and his European Rhythm Machine at the Frankfurt Jazz Festival (Embryo)
 1970: Phil Woods and his European Rhythm Machine at the Montreux Jazz Festival (MGM)
 1972: Live At Montreux 72 (Verve)
 1974: New Music by the New Phil Woods Quartet (Testament)
 1974: Musique du Bois (Muse)
 1975: Floresta Canto (RCA) with Chris Gunning Orchestra
 1975: Images (RCA Victor) with Michel Legrand
 1976: Phil Woods & The Japanese Rhythm Machine (RCA Victor)
 1976: The New Phil Woods Album
 1976: Altology (Prestige)
 1977: Live from the Show Boat
 1977: Summer Afternoon Jazz (Hindsight)
 1978: Song for Sisyphus (King (Japan))
 1979: I Remember (Gryphon)
 1980: Phil Woods Quartet Live (Clean Cuts)
 1980: Phil Woods/Lew Tabackin (Omnisound) with Lew Tabackin
 1981: Three for All (Enja) with Tommy Flanagan and Red Mitchell
 1981: 'More' Live (Adelphi)
 1981: European Tour Live (Red)
 1982: Live from New York (Palo Alto)
 1983: At the Vanguard (Antilles)
 1984: Integrity (Red)
 1984: Heaven (Evidence)
 1984: Piper at the Gates of Dawn (Sea Breeze Jazz) with Chris Swansen
 1986: Dizzy Gillespie Meets Phil Woods Quintet (Timeless) with Dizzy Gillespie
 1987: Bop Stew; Bouquet (Concord)
 1988: Evolution; Here's to My Lady (Concord)
 1988 "Little Big Band Évolution"
 1989: Embracable You (Philology)
 1989: My Man Benny, My Man Phil (MusicMasters) with Benny Carter
 1989: Here's to My Lady (Chesky)
 1990: Flash (Concord)
 1990: Phil's Mood (Philology)
 1991: All Bird Children; Real Life (Concord)
 1991: Flowers for Hodges (Concord)
 1991 "Altoist"
 1991: Real Life, The Little Big Band (Chesky)
 1992: Full House (Milestone)
 1994: Just Friends; Our Monk (Philology)
 1995: Plays the Music of Jim McNeely (TCB)
 1996: Mile High Jazz Live in Denver (Concord)
 1996: Another Time, Another Place (Evening Star) with Benny Carter
 1996: Astor and Elis (Chesky)
 1996: The Complete Concert (JMS) with Gordon Beck
 1997: Celebration! (Concord)
 1998: The Rev and I (Blue Note) with Johnny Griffin
 1999: Cool Woods (somethin' else)
 2003: The Thrill Is Gone (Venus)
 2004: Beyond Brooklyn with Herbie Mann, finished weeks before Mann's death
 2006: Pass the Bebop (Cowbell) with Benjamin Koppel and Alex Riel Trio
 2006: Tel Aviv Jazz Festival (Philology) with Robert Anchipolovsky and Tony Pancella Trio
 2006:   American Songbook (Kind of Blue) with Brian Lynch 
 2007:   American Songbook, Vol. 2 (Kind of Blue) with Brian Lynch
 2009: Ballads & Blues (Venus)
 2011: Man with the Hat (Pazz) with Grace Kelly
 2011: Phil & Bill with Bill Mays (Palmetto)

Compilation 
 Into the Woods (The Best of Phil Woods)  (Concord, 1996)
 Moonlight In Vermont (CTI, 2005)[4CD]

As sideman 

With Manny Albam
 Jazz Goes to the Movies (Impulse!, 1962)
 The Soul of the City (Solid State, 1966)

With Gary Burton
 1962: Who Is Gary Burton? (RCA, 1963)
 1964: The Groovy Sound of Music (RCA, 1965)

With Dizzy Gillespie
 World Statesman (Norgran, 1956)
 Dizzy in Greece (Verve, 1957)
 The New Continent (Limelight, 1962)
 Rhythmstick (CTI, 1990)

With Friedrich Gulda
 Friedrich Gulda at Birdland (RCA Victor, 1957)
 A Man of Letters (Decca, 1957)

With Quincy Jones
 The Birth of a Band! (Mercury, 1959)
 The Great Wide World of Quincy Jones (Mercury, 1959)
 I Dig Dancers (Mercury, 1960)
 The Quintessence (Impulse!, 1961)
 Quincy Jones Explores the Music of Henry Mancini (Mercury, 1964)
 Golden Boy (Mercury, 1964)
 I/We Had a Ball (Limelight, 1965)
 Quincy Plays for Pussycats (Mercury, 1965]) – recorded in 1959-65

With Michel Legrand
 Legrand Jazz (Philips, 1958)
 After the Rain (Pablo, 1982)
 Michel Legrand and Friends  (RCA, 1975)

With Bryan Lynch
 Simpático (The Brian Lynch/Eddie Palmieri Project) (ArtistShare, 2006)
 Bolero Nights for Billie Holiday (Venus, 2008)

With Herbie Mann
 The Jazz We Heard Last Summer (Savoy, 1957)
 Yardbird Suite (Savoy, 1957)

With the Modern Jazz Quartet
 Jazz Dialogue (Atlantic, 1965)
 MJQ & Friends: A 40th Anniversary Celebration (Atlantic, 1994)

With Thelonious Monk
 The Thelonious Monk Orchestra at Town Hall (Riverside, 1959) – live
 Big Band and Quartet in Concert (Columbia, 1963) – live

With Oliver Nelson
 Impressions of Phaedra (United Artists, 1962)
 Full Nelson (Verve, 1963)
 More Blues and the Abstract Truth (Impulse!, 1964)
 Fantabulous (Argo, 1964)
 Oliver Nelson Plays Michelle (Impulse!, 1966)
 Happenings with Hank Jones (Impulse!, 1966)
 The Sound of Feeling (Verve, 1966)
 Encyclopedia of Jazz (Verve, 1966)
 The Spirit of '67 with Pee Wee Russell (Impulse!, 1967)
 The Kennedy Dream (Impulse!, 1967)
 Jazzhattan Suite (Verve, 1968)

With Lalo Schifrin
 Samba Para Dos with Bob Brookmeyer (Verve, 1963)
 Once a Thief and Other Themes (Verve, 1965)

With Jimmy Smith
 Monster (Verve, 1965)
 Hoochie Coochie Man (Verve, 1966)
 Got My Mojo Workin' (Verve, 1966)

With Clark Terry
 The Happy Horns of Clark Terry (Impulse!, 1964)
 Squeeze Me! (Chiaroscuro, 1989)

With George Wallington
 Jazz for the Carriage Trade (Prestige, 1956)
 The New York Scene (Prestige, 1957)
 Jazz at Hotchkiss (Savoy, 1957)

With others
 Greg Abate, Kindred Spirits: Live at Chan's (Whaling City Sound, 2016)[2CD] – live recorded in 2014
 Franco Ambrosetti, Heartbop (Enja, 1981)
 Benny Bailey, Big Brass (Candid, 1960)
 Louis Bellson and Gene Krupa, The Mighty Two (Roulette, 1963)
 Bob Brookmeyer, Gloomy Sunday and Other Bright Moments (Verve, 1961)
 Kenny Burrell, A Generation Ago Today (Verve, 1967)
 Benny Carter, Further Definitions (Impulse!, 1961)
 Ron Carter, Anything Goes (Kudu, 1975)
 the Kenny Clarke/Francy Boland Big Band, Latin Kaleidoscope (MPS, 1968)
 Al Cohn, Jazz Mission to Moscow (Colpix, 1962)
 Eddie Costa, Eddie Costa Quintet (Interlude, 1957)
 Lou Donaldson, Rough House Blues (Cadet, 1964)
 Bill Evans, Symbiosis (MPS, 1974)
 Gil Evans, The Individualism of Gil Evans (Verve, 1964)
 Art Farmer, Listen to Art Farmer and the Orchestra (Mercury, 1962)
 Stephane Grappelli, Classic Sessions: Stephane Grappelli (Who's Who In Jazz, 1987)
 Kenyon Hopkins, The Hustler (soundtrack) (Kapp, 1961)
 Milt Jackson, Ray Brown / Milt Jackson with Ray Brown (Verve, 1965)
 Billy Joel, Just The Way You Are on album The Stranger CBS, 1977)
 John Lewis, Essence (Atlantic, 1962)
 Mundell Lowe, Satan in High Heels (soundtrack) (Charlie Parker, 1961)
 Gary McFarland, The Jazz Version of "How to Succeed in Business without Really Trying" (Verve, 1962)
 Nellie McKay, Obligatory Villagers (Hungry Mouse, 2007)
 Carmen McRae, Something to Swing About (Kapp, 1959)
 Joe Newman, Salute to Satch (RCA Victor, 1956)
 Anita O'Day, All the Sad Young Men (Verve, 1962)
 Pony Poindexter, Pony's Express (Epic, 1962)
 Jimmy Raney, Jimmy Raney Quintet (Prestige, 1954)[10"]
 Jimmy Raney and Dick Hyman, Early Quintets (Prestige, 1969) – compilation
 Shirley Scott, Roll 'Em: Shirley Scott Plays the Big Bands (Impulse!, 1966)
 Sahib Shihab, Jazz Sahib (Savoy, 1957)
 Paul Simon, Still Crazy After All These Years (Columbia, 1975) - 1 track “Have a Good Time”
 Steely Dan, Katy Lied (ABC, 1975) – 1 track "Dr. Wu"
 Chris Swansen, Crazy Horse (Atlas, 1979)
 Billy Taylor, Kwamina (Mercury, 1961)
 Kai Winding, Kai Olé (Verve, 1961)

Notes

References
 Gonzalez, Henry (1990). The Armadillo Years: A Visual History
 Nisenson, Eric (1996).  Round About Midnight – A Portrait of Miles Davis (2nd ed.). Da Capo: Printing Press.  .
 Burke, Debbie (2011). The Poconos in B Flat. ISBN 978-1469134598.

External links

Official site
 

1931 births
2015 deaths
Musicians from Springfield, Massachusetts
Bebop saxophonists
Hard bop saxophonists
Post-bop saxophonists
Bebop clarinetists
Hard bop clarinetists
Post-bop clarinetists
American jazz bandleaders
American jazz alto saxophonists
American male saxophonists
Grammy Award winners
Juilliard School alumni
Manhattan School of Music alumni
Savoy Records artists
Antilles Records artists
RCA Records artists
Verve Records artists
Prestige Records artists
Muse Records artists
Palo Alto Records artists
Concord Records artists
Chesky Records artists
Jazz musicians from Massachusetts
20th-century American musicians
21st-century American musicians
People from East Stroudsburg, Pennsylvania
Jazz musicians from Pennsylvania
American male jazz musicians
Kenny Clarke/Francy Boland Big Band members
Orchestra U.S.A. members
20th-century American male musicians
21st-century American male musicians